Problem-oriented policing (POP), coined by University of Wisconsin–Madison professor Herman Goldstein, is a policing strategy that involves the identification and analysis of specific crime and disorder problems, in order to develop effective response strategies. POP requires police to identify and target underlying problems that can lead to crime. Goldstein suggested it as an improvement on the reactive, incident-driven “standard model of policing”. 

Goldstein's 1979 model was expanded in 1987 by John E. Eck and William Spelman into the Scanning, Analysis, Response, and Assessment (SARA) model for problem solving. This strategy places more emphasis on research and analysis as well as crime prevention and the engagement of public and private organizations in the reduction of community problems.

A systematic review of this model, based on 34 randomized control trials and quasi-experimental studies, found that problem-oriented policing is effective at reducing crime and disorder, but had a limited effect on police legitimacy and fear of crime. There is also the risk of overreach, corruption, and abuse of authority, when officers interfere before crimes have actually occurred.

Introduction 

Problem-oriented policing relies on the identification of problems by rank-and-file officers.  Not all departments will define problems the same way, but a typical definition is:
 Repeated incidents;
 Occurring in a community;
 With related characteristics (e.g., behavior, location, people, time);
 That concern both the community and the police.
Key concepts Goldstein argued that one must tackle the causes of the problem. Eck and Spelman developed a twelve-step model of what problem-oriented policing agency should do:
 Focus on problems of concern to the public.
 Zero in on effectiveness as the primary concern.
 Be proactive.
 Be committed to systematic inquiry as a first step in solving substantive problems.
 Encourage the use of rigorous methods in making inquiries.
 Make full use of the data in police files and the experience of police personnel.
 Group like incidents together so that they can be addressed as a common problem.
 Avoid using overly broad labels in grouping incidents so separate problems can be identified.
 Encourage a broad and uninhibited search for solutions.
 Acknowledge the limits of the criminal justice system as a response to problems.
 Identify multiple interests in any one problem and weigh them when analyzing the value of different responses.
 Be committed to taking some risks in responding to problems.
Where, under a traditional system, a patrol officer might answer repeated calls to a certain problem area or "hot spot" and deal only with each individual incident, that officer is encouraged under POP to discover the root cause of the problem and come up with ways of solving it. The goal is to find a cure for the ailment instead of merely treating the symptoms. Some might confuse community-oriented policing with problem-oriented policing, but the main focus of community-oriented policing is the improvement of the relationship between law enforcement and the citizens, while problem-oriented policing is depending on information of the citizens and a good relationship with the community.

The exploration of possible responses to a problem is handled by patrol officers. Once a problem is identified, officers are expected to work closely with community members to develop a solution, which can include a wide range of alternatives to arrest. Problem-oriented policing gives law enforcement a model for addressing the conditions that created and caused other problems of concern to the community. Communities must ensure law enforcement are addressing and responding to concerns of citizens. Problem-oriented policing is predicated on community involvement and support is key if law enforcement hopes to rectify crime. In Scanning, Analysis, Response, and Assessment (SARA), “Scanning” is the first step and require police identifying and prioritizing potential problems in their jurisdiction. Second, the acronym “A” stands for analysis, for example analyzing the time of day when incidents occur, determining who the offenders are and why they prefer the park and investigate the particular areas of the park that are most conducive to the activity. In addition, evaluating their environmental design characteristics. Analysis also involves the police to use data sources, so the proper responses can be manifested. The third step, response, has the police develop and implement interventions designed to rectify the problems. The final step is assessment, which involves evaluating the impact of the response and what good has been accomplished.

These may focus on the offender, the community, the environment, outside agencies, or the need for some kind of mediation.  Situations often demand that police and citizens fashion tailor-made responses to problems, so a high degree of importance is placed on creativity and discretion.

Political issues and conflicts between actors 

Successes in problem solving are well documented in study after study. One anthology by Ronald Glensor, Mark Correia and Kenneth Peak suggest it represents a "new policing". However, it is a new policing with varying degrees of success (Policing Communities: Understanding Crime and Solving Problems, Roxbury Publishing, 2000, page 1). This success has led to the problem-oriented approach being popular among police administrators and high-ranking city officials. Other factors affecting this preference is that public favor translates into job security for administrators and elected officials and that it gives the opportunity to collect substantial sums of money through federal grants.  In 1995, a federal grant of $327 million from the U.S. Department of Justice was divided up among police departments implementing POP programs in the state of Arizona.  The availability of federal grant money creates a real incentive for police agencies to use POP. Federal agencies and national policing groups, the creation of national awards for effective problem-oriented policing programs and implementation throughout the world. The U.S federal agency, the office of Community Oriented Policing Services (COPS) adopted key strategy, and funding for POP (www.popcenter.org).
.

Because POP policy may require considerable organizational restructuring, administrators can justify applications for inordinately large funds.

Some rank-and-file officers, however, often do not share their administrators' enthusiasm.  One of the reasons for this may be a lack of clarity with respect to organizational goals. Policing has from the beginning had a lack of clarity of organizational goals, and the introduction of POP does not always solve the problem. Consequently, rank and file officers assuming this lack of clarity concern will be resolved by POP and are disappointed when that is not done. Poorly defined or ambiguous goals can lead to stress and frustration.  Another possible source of rank-and-file discontent is militant police unionism in which union leadership sees POP as an expansion of police duties and attempts to include these duties into collective bargaining.

A further source of frustration by some officers is the conflict between the administration's community policing mandate and the continuing need to respond to calls for service.

Significant impacts of POP policy 

Problem-oriented policing often has a number of effects and some unintended consequences that flow from them. 
Among the most dramatic impacts of POP is that it works. POP successes are robust and are demonstrated in studies and publications over two decades.

One example of these success stories is the hundreds of POP projects submitted to the Herman Goldstein Problem-Solving Award program each year at the International POP Conference (www.popcenter.org). The projects illustrate that police departments across the world have been implementing POP measures onto a wide range of issues from car theft and school bullying to homicide and gang problems. The projects demonstrate the wide acceptance of the method as a way to reduce significant problems.

Another example of these successes are the numerous publications documenting success over the decades. Examples include Kenneth Peak and Ronald Glensor's text "Community Policing and Problem Solving: Strategies and Practices" (Prentice Hall, 1996) and Corina Sole Brito and Tracy Allan's "Problem Oriented Policing: Crime-Specific Problems, Critical Issues, Making POP Work - Volume 2" (Police Executive Research Forum, 1999).

A systematic review assessed the available evidence on the effect of problem-oriented policing, with a focus on the Scanning, Analysis, Response, and Assessment model, in reducing crime and improving citizens perceptions of police. Based on 34 randomized control trials and quasi-experimental studies, they found that problem-oriented policing is effective at reducing crime and disorder, but had a limited effect on police legitimacy and fear of crime.

Criticism
The majority of problem-oriented policing projects fail to investigate displacement. Law enforcement is generally satisfied to achieve a crime reduction in the targeted area and may be less concerned if crime is displaced outside their jurisdiction. However assessing and understanding potential displacement effects can help ensure the effectiveness of your problem-oriented policing. However determining the extent of displacement will also assist in defending your results to critics. According to the Center for Problem-Oriented Policing, “Crime displacement is the relocation of crime from one place, time target offense, or tactic to another as a result of some prevention initiative”(Defining 2012). In addition, displacement is viewed as a negative consequence of crime prevention efforts, however, it can provide benefits. However, if a community has no trust in law enforcement, then situations like the above case studies will take place. Law enforcement and the community will have friction. As difficult as it often is for police officers to obtain "buy-in" within. It is often even more difficult to convince people outside
the police department to carry out specific tasks faithfully and properly without a negative inference of its inadequacy in satisfying the expectations of the masses (Scott n.d).

Increased communication with the public 

Under POP, the public has a much more direct hand in defining the goals of the police and influencing what issues the police will focus on.  On one hand it is possible that this can cause a conflict between what is traditionally of high importance to the police, such as robberies, burglaries and violent crime, and what is a priority to community members – which may be things as mundane as loitering crowds or acts of graffiti.

This mismatch of priorities can hinder the relationship between the police and the community.  It can also make the officer's job more difficult and stressful as he or she is presented with conflicting mandates, one set coming from within and the other from without (the community).

On the other hand, actual experience in POP illustrates how POP projects also focuses on those very same crime concerns of importance to police. One example is the gangs and gun homicide reduction project reported by Anthony Bragga, David Kennedy, Anne Piehl and Elin Waring is their evaluation study "The Boston Gun Project's Operation  Ceasefire - Measuring the Impact of Operation Ceasefire" (National Institute of Justice, 2001).

Case Study 1	
	The SARA model can be very effective, but criminals tend to adapt and find some other form to operate crime. For example, for generations, a fairly small six-block area called The Village of Hempstead, New York has become a nightmare for most residence calling it “Terror Avenue,” because of all the murders and crime that have developed on that street. This community was plagued with open-air drug markets. Hempstead was the largest number of returning probationers and parolees in Nassau County. For more than 30 years, the six block radius in Hempstead has been the county's crime hot spot and predicated itself to open-air drug market. With 6,000 residents and dense apartment buildings with over 800 units, had some of the highest Uniform Crime Report numbers, community complaints, unemployment and school dropouts in Nassau County (Reiss 2008).
	They used this unique strategy called the ‘High Point’ model which identified and formulated cases on major drug dealers and their drug market. To prevent reproduction from reoccurring  they went to community leaders and hosted meetings to inform the public on the idea of transforming ‘Terror Avenue.’ The use of confidential informants made drug buys, but dealers were not arrested, instead, they were videotaped. The investigation and analysis gathered showed about fifty individuals were major drug dealers in this open drug market. Law enforcement finally gained the public's trust once they found out through community meetings that the District Attorney and Law enforcement personnel wanted to help and not just lock away their loved ones. Non-violent dealers were invited to a community intervention where family and community leaders voiced their intolerance for dealing drugs.in the year 2005–2007, 44 percent of the narcotics and 169 major crimes were reported in the six-block area of Terrace-Bedell. The open air drug market manifested prostitution, auto thefts, robberies, loitering, murders, and traffic.
	First the scanning, in this case, was the open drug market that plagued the community with crime. The Analysis is mapping out data to determine the focus of the area collected was indeed Terrace-Bedell street corner. The response is use suppression by gathering with local community leaders, local residents, informants. The findings were about fifty drug dealers were the ones creating the open drug market. Eighteen nonviolent drug offenders were invited to attend the “gathering” (meeting). The Assessment resulted in crime reduction, trust in the police department and more intervention and adult interdiction programs.  Another possible conflict may exist between the proactive implementation of POP and the need for traditional “incident-driven” policing.  In large metropolitan areas, dispatchers receive a high volume of 911 emergencies and calls for service around the clock.  Some areas of the city may be quieter than others, and these are typically the areas that do not have many problems.

Case study 2	Another case study that used SARA for tackling hot spots and crime using Mutualism is Mobile County. For example, in Mobile County in the state of Alabama, methamphetamine was on the rise. Mobile Counties narcotics unit seized 29 pounds 12 ounces of methamphetamine and more than 1 gallon of methamphetamine (Bettner n.d). The investigators used traditional drug enforcement techniques but were unsuccessful. The second approach was the availability and precursors needed to manufacture Methamphetamine. For example, the MCSO Narcotics Unit concentrated on state laws such as (20-2-190) that focused and managed reporting/tracking requirements on medication containing Pseudophedrine as a precursor.
	When discussing Mutualism, the main component that facilitates Meth enterprises is the chemical. Mobile Counties Narcotics focused on Pseudoephedrine sales of 88 pharmacies located in Mobile County and 47 pharmacies located in Baldwin County. In addition, MCSO focused on 135 pharmacies located in Mobile and Baldwin County, they identified 435 non-pharmacy type stores who were licensed by the Alabama ABC Board to sale Pseudoephedrine products (Bettner n.d). Profoundly with diligent compliance and enforcement initiatives by the MCSO of the non-pharmacy type stores was reduced to 50 non-pharmacy type stores by 2009. According to Marcus Felson author of Crime and Nature “obligate mutualisms are essential for survival. Apples are in trouble without honeybees” (Felson 2006). Using SARA or obligate mutualism can be assessed by Taking away the main ingredient that creates theobligatee mutualism between the operator and cook, which serves as a deterrent for meth labs and drug manufacturing.
	According to the Department of Justice Clandestine methamphetamine labs cause three main types of harm: (1) physical injury from explosions, fires, chemical burns, and toxic fumes; (2) environmental hazards; and (3) child endangerment (Scott 2006). The offenders in operations were tricky because the majority of laboratory owners set up the labs in their own premises, a family member, or co-offender in to have better access for manufacturing purposes (Chiu 2011). The offender would storage equipment in a families members name who was law abiding. Most of the equipment was quite easy to purchase and storage. For example, “glassware was found in bedrooms, kitchens, sheds, and cupboards or chemical precursors stockpiled in drawers” (Bettner n.d.). Cooking the product was done by either experienced or non-experienced cooks. For example, in some of the more strategic offender foraging, chemistry experts were brought in to help in with the cooking process. This part of the process is very crucial because much money is being invested into each batch. For example, it was estimated one patch cost $70,000 and can be turned for $200,000 to $400,000. Profits of the offender's transcripts and bank statements indicated where the monies would go and how much was due to each offender. The initial stages of the illegal manufacturing are dependent upon the legal enterprises such as pharmacies, rental storage spaces and personal business (Chiu 2011). Law enforcement not only use suppression and data to target their problem, they use laws and ordinances. Statutes and ordinances are tools used for problem-oriented policing.

Relationships between officers 

Complications can arise if police managers are unschooled in the proper implementation of POP strategies. For example, certain officers in each department are designated as community problem solvers or if a few enthusiastic officers earnestly commit themselves to the POP process, as this leaves the others on the same shift to pick up the slack in responding to calls for service. This can lead to tension and resentment, which in turn can diminish morale and adversely affect the ability of the officers to function as a team and be productive. Of course the bigger question is "productive for what?". POP argues that traditionally police were productive in handing out tickets and making arrests. However, these tactics did not ensure crime decreased. In fact, numerous criminological studies showed they made no impact whatsoever on the greater sense of public safety as first reported in the famous study by George Kelling and others (The Kansas City Preventive Patrol Experiment, Police Foundation, 1974). 

POP creates specific goals in tackling tangible problems. Productivity is determined by resolving problems. If tickets and arrests help do that, they are employed. If they don't help that, then other more creative strategies are employed. Consequently, the actual reason tension and resentment arises is because officers are ill-trained in creative problem-solving and feel they do not get adequate supervision or time to do POP. Contrary to the tension and resentment issue in some agencies, in other more successful agencies, proper implementation of POP is established so that sophisticated problem-solving is part of the promotional process and officers come to see involvement in POP as a career path to more advanced ranks.

Abuse of authority or heightened conservatism 

Increased discretion creates a risk for abuses of authority. POP encourages police to actively intervene in situations they had previously left alone, which presents more opportunities for abuse and a “net-widening” effect.. The POP projects published to date (over 700 are listed in the POP library at www.popcenter.org) suggest that in most cases officers collaborate with community members in selecting proper levels of discretion and choose problems they, and the public, want resolved. Although there is no evidence to suggest it is actually happening, there is a possibility that increased discretion coupled with the possibility of larger social consequences could make officers more conservative in their approach; perhaps too conservative to fully achieve POP goals. In summary, POP represents one of the more lasting and successful components of the community policing movement. It has stood the test of time thus far and delivered a plethora of successful projects in resolving community crime and disorder. Michael Scott's 20-year retrospective concludes: "After 20 years, problem-oriented policing has demonstrated an internal logic that has been successfully applied at the project level, and remains a promising approach for the foreseeable future." (Michael Scott, Problem Oriented Policing: Reflections on the First 20 Years, U.S. Department of Justice, Washington, 2000. page 129).

Evaluations 

The Center For Evidence-Based Crime Policy in George Mason University identifies the following randomized controlled trials on community policing as very rigorous.

See also
 Community oriented policing
 Crime displacement
 Broken windows theory
 Intelligence-led policing
 Evidence-based policing
Peelian principles
Neighbourhood policing team

Notes

References
References
Defining Displacement (2012, October 22). In Center for Problem-Oriented Policing. Retrieved December 2, 2012, from http://www.popcenter.org/tools/displacement/2
Felson, M. (2006). Crime and Nature (pp. 79–109). New Delhi, India: Sage Publications India 		Pvt. Ltd.
Harocopos, A., & Hough, M. (2007). Problem-Specific Guides Series . In Community Oriented 		Policing Services U.S Department of Justice. Retrieved October 21, 2012, from http://blackboard.csusb.edu/bbcswebdav/courses/128cjus47001/open_air_drug_markets_GUIDEBOOK.pdf
Kerner, H., & Weitekamp, E. (2003, November). Problem solving policing: Views of citizens and 	citizens expectations in Germany. In Social work and society international online journal. 	Retrieved December 2, 2012, from http://www.socwork.net/sws/article/view/253/428 
Reiss, M. (2008). Renaming Terror Avenue. In BlackBoard. Retrieved October 21, 2012, from 	99http://blackboard.csusb.edu/bbcswebdav/courses/128cjus47001/open_air_drug_markets.pdf
Scott, M. S. (n.d.). Lessons Learned from Problem oriented policing projects. In Implementing Crime Prevention. Retrieved December 2, 2012, from http://law.wisc.edu/m/ymmxn/implementing_î€€crimeî€%20_î€€preventionî€%20.pdf
Weisburd, D., Telep, C. W., Hinkle, J. C., & Eck, J. E. (2010). Is problem-oriented policing effective in reducing crime and disorder?. Criminology & Public Policy, 9(1), 139–172.

External links 
 Center for Problem-Oriented Policing
 Herman Goldstein, Improving Policing: A Problem-Oriented Approach, Crime & Delinquency (April 1979):236-243.

Law enforcement theory
Law enforcement techniques
Crime prevention
Types of policing